The Dinh River is a river of Vietnam. It flows for 40 kilometres through Bà Rịa–Vũng Tàu province.

References

Rivers of Bà Rịa-Vũng Tàu province
Rivers of Vietnam